Milenko Jovanov (born 13 September 1980) is a Serbian politician. He has been a member of the National Assembly since 2020 and he previously served in the Assembly of Vojvodina from 2012 to 2020. He has led the Together We Can Do Everything parliamentary group since August 2022.

Personal life
Jovanov was born in 1980 in Kikinda, Vojvodina, in what was then the Socialist Republic of Serbia in the Socialist Federal Republic of Yugoslavia. He holds a Bachelor of Laws degree from the University of Belgrade and later graduated in specialist vocational studies from the Faculty of Political Science at the same institution.

Politician
Jovanov joined the Democratic Party of Serbia (Demokratska stranka Srbije, DSS) in 2001 and held several leadership positions in the party, including president of its provincial board in Vojvodina and vice-president at the republic level.

Provincial politics
Jovanov received the fourth position on the DSS's electoral list in the 2012 Vojvodina provincial election and was elected to the assembly when the list won four mandates. He resigned from the DSS in 2015 and later joined the Progressive Party.

He received the eleventh position on the Progressive Party's list in the 2016 Vojvodina provincial election and was elected to a second term when the list won a majority victory with sixty-three mandates. In the 2016–20 sitting of the assembly, he served as president of the Progressive Party's group of deputies, was vice-president of the committee on issues on the constitutional and legal status of the province, and was a member of the committee on regulations. He was elected as a vice-president of the Serbian Progressive Party in 2016.

Municipal politics
Jovanov was given the lead position on the DSS's list for the Kikinda municipal assembly in the 2012 Serbian local elections and was elected when the list won two mandates. He received the eleventh position on the Progressive Party's list in the 2016 Serbian local elections and was re-elected when the list won a majority victory with twenty-six out of thirty-nine mandates. He was not a candidate in 2020.

Parliamentarian
Jovanov received the twenty-second position on the Progressive Party's Aleksandar Vučić — For Our Children list for the 2020 Serbian parliamentary election and was elected when the list won a landslide majority with 188 mandates. He is now a member of the assembly committee on constitutional and legislative issues, the leader of Serbia's parliamentary friendship group with Norway, and a member of the parliamentary friendship groups with Israel and Romania. Jovanov served as the vice president of SNS until 2021.

References

1980 births
Living people
Politicians from Kikinda
Members of the Assembly of Vojvodina
Members of the National Assembly (Serbia)
Democratic Party of Serbia politicians
Serbian Progressive Party politicians